Théophile de Giraud (born 19 November 1968) is a Belgian writer, philosopher and activist of French language.

Literary work 
Published in 2000, De Giraud's first book, The Impertinence of Procreation, is a plea against human reproduction, using a mixture of humor and provocation. Noted for his many eccentricities, De Giraud was listed in the anthology Les Fous Littéraires by the pataphysician André Blavier.

De Giraud's essay The Art of Guillotining the Procreators: Anti-Natalist Manifesto, published in 2006, is a rewrite of his first work. The central message of the work is "If you love children, don't create them". After having tried to show that life is only pain and that ethics is incompatible with reproduction, De Giraud argued for school training for parenthood, adoption and a procreation strike to end the reproduction imposed by patriarchy. He cited many classical authors to illustrate his points.

In a different register, De Giraud described as a "dandy punk in rupture", published in 2008, a poetic essay on the cold wave entitled "Cold Love, Satanic Sex and Funny Suicide", with a preface written by Jean-Luc De Meyer, singer of Front 242. Through numerous extracts of songs, he reviews several themes of the cold wave movement and the origin of Gothic movement, such as the love of sex and death, the hatred of the family and even the celebration of the end of the world and the human race; all with a humorous and inventive style.
 
De Giraud also contributed to the collective book Fewer, More Happy: The Urgency to Rethink Demography, collated by Michel Sourrouille.

Activism 
A figure of the antinatalism and childfree movement, De Giraud is one of the co-creators of Non-Parents Day, celebrated between 2009 and 2011, alternately in Brussels and Paris. In 2008, he covered a statue of Leopold II in Brussels with red paint, to denounce the public valorisation of the king who established the colonial system of the Belgian Congo. In 2012, he organised a "denatalist" event in Paris to bring attention to the overpopulation taboo and to the value of refusing to give birth for ecological reasons.

Awards 

 Winner of the Belgian Vocation Foundation (1998)
 Childfree Man of the Year (2013)

Selected works 

 The Impertinence of Procreation, Brussels, self-published, 2000.
 One Hundred Necromantic Haikus, preface by Jean-Pierre Verheggen, foreword and afterword by André Stas, Spa, ed. Galopin, 2004.
 The Art of Guillotining Procreators: An Anti-natalist Manifesto, Nancy, ed. Le Mort-Qui-Trompe, 2006.
 Diogenesis, Fluorescent Poems to Wait Between Two Genocides, Brussels, ed. Maelström, 2008.
 Cold Love, Satanic Sex and Funny Suicide, preface by Jean-Luc De Meyer, Nancy, ed. Le Mort-Qui-Trompe, 2008.
 Aphorisms for the Use of Future Familicides, preface by Corinne Maier, foreword by Serge Poliart, Brussels, ed. Maelström, 2013.
 The Childfree Christ: Antinatalism in Early Christianity, ed. AFNIL, 2021.

See also 

 Voluntary Human Extinction Movement

References

External links 

 
 Antinatalist speech given by Théophile de Giraud during the General Assembly in Berlin (2017)

1968 births
Living people
21st-century Belgian writers
21st-century Belgian philosophers
Anti-natalists
Belgian activists
Belgian writers in French
Childfree
People from Namur (city)